Ricardo dos Santos (23 May 1990 – 20 January 2015) was a Brazilian surfer. Dos Santos reached the quarterfinals at the 2012 Billabong Pro event in Tahiti in defeating among others Kelly Slater. At the aforementioned Tahitian tourney he was also presented with the Andy Irons award, bestowed upon the event's most determined competitor. He reached a career high Association of Surfing Professionals  QS ranking of 62 in 2011.

Dos Santos was shot dead on January 20, 2015, by an off duty police officer outside his home in southern Brazil close to the city of Florianópolis.  He was 24. The officer involved in his death was sentenced to 22 years in prison.  It later emerged that Dos Santos was shot in the back.  Over one thousand people attended the surfer's funeral.

References

 
1990 births
2015 deaths
Brazilian surfers
Sportspeople from Santa Catarina (state)
People shot dead by law enforcement officers in Brazil
People murdered in Brazil
World Surf League surfers